Publius Seius Fuscianus (c. 120 – aft. 189) was a suffect consul c. 151, Praefectus urbi from 187 to 189, and consul ordinarius in 188. He was a childhood friend and schoolmate of Emperor Marcus Aurelius.

Géza Alföldy notes that Fuscianus and the colleague of his second consulate, Marcus Servilius Silanus, both were "highly qualified" and suggests that they might have been senior members of Marcus Aurelius' command during the Marcomannic Wars. Anthony Birley suggests that Fuscianus played a role in the preservation and publication of the emperor's Meditations.

Sources

Further reading 
 Prosopographia Imperii Romani (PIR) ² S 317

2nd-century Romans
Imperial Roman consuls
Urban prefects of Rome
120s births
Year of birth uncertain
Year of death unknown
Fuscianus, Publius Seius